John Bolton (3 October 1881 – 23 September 1935) was an Australian cricketer. He played in five first-class matches for Queensland between 1911 and 1915.

See also
 List of Queensland first-class cricketers

References

External links
 

1881 births
1935 deaths
Australian cricketers
Queensland cricketers
Cricketers from Sydney